Stevenson Ellis Sylvester (born July 18, 1988) is a former American football linebacker. He played college football at the University of Utah. He was drafted by the Pittsburgh Steelers in the fifth round of the 2010 NFL Draft.

Early years
Sylvester was born to parents Worrel Sylvester and Angela Levi in Las Vegas, Nevada. His mother played college basketball for the Southern Utah University for four years. As a senior at Valley High School in Las Vegas, Sylvester was not highly recruited.  The only school that made a scholarship offer, the University of Utah, only began recruiting Sylvester midway during his senior year.

College career
As a true freshman in 2006, Sylvester started in 3 games, but saw action in 10. He ended his freshman season with 23 tackles, 1.5 for loss, 0.5 sacks, one pass defensed, one forced fumble and an interception which he returned 45 yards for a touchdown.

In 2007, Sylvester played in all 13 games, starting 8.  He was second on the team in tackles and tackles for loss with 86 and 10 respectively.  He had his best game of the year against his home town UNLV Rebels with 14 tackles 2.5 for a loss.  He ended the year with 6 tackles in the bowl game against Navy and Honorable Mention All-MWC and helped lead the Utes to an eventual 9-4 record.

Sylvester was named as one of the defensive captains in his junior year  and helped lead the 2008 Utes to a 13–0 record and a final ranking of No. 2 in the BCS rankings.  Sylvester was named second-team All-MWC with 121 tackles, 16 for loss and 7.5 sacks.  He finished the season with a remarkable performance in the Sugar Bowl, with 7 tackles, 3 sacks, 1 interception and a fumble recovery.

Professional career

2010 NFL Draft
After a strong junior season, Stevenson Sylvester was projected to go in the second round of the 2010 draft. However, his draft stock dropped after his senior season statistics failed to achieve expectations, and he was selected by the Steelers in the fifth round of the 2010 NFL Draft.

Pittsburgh Steelers
On August 25, 2013, he was cut by the Steelers. He was re-signed on October 9, 2013, when the Steelers released linebacker Kion Wilson.

Buffalo Bills
On July 16, 2014, he was signed by the Buffalo Bills. On August 20, 2014, Sylvester was placed on injured reserved for a torn patellar tendon in his knee, ending his season.

References

External links

Twitter
Steelers Bio
Utah Utes Bio

1988 births
Living people
Players of American football from Nevada
Sportspeople from Las Vegas
American football linebackers
Utah Utes football players
Pittsburgh Steelers players
Buffalo Bills players